2,4-Dinitrochlorobenzene (DNCB) is an organic compound with the chemical formula (O2N)2C6H3Cl. It is a yellow solid that is soluble in organic solvents. It is an important intermediate for the industrial production of other compounds.

DNCB is produced commercially by the nitration of p-nitrochlorobenzene with a mixture of nitric and sulfuric acids. Other methods afford the compound less efficiently include the chlorination of dinitrobenzene, nitration of o-nitrochlorobenzene and the dinitration of chlorobenzene.

Uses
By virtue of the two nitro groups, the chloride is susceptible to nucleophilic substitution. In this way, the compound is a precursor to many other compounds.

Laboratory use
DNCB is used as a substrate in GST enzyme activity assays. The molecule is conjugated to a single molecule of reduced glutathione which then absorbs at 340 nm. Affinity of CDNB for each class of GST varies and so it is not a good measure of activity for some forms (e.g. GSTT and GSTZ).

Medical use
DNCB can be used to treat warts with an effective cure rate of 80%. DNCB induces an allergic immune response toward the wart-causing virus.

Safety 
DNCB induces a type IV hypersensitivity reaction in almost all people exposed to it, so it is used medically to assess the T cell activity in patients. This is a useful diagnostic test for immunocompromised patients. It can also be used to treat warts.

DNCB can cause contact dermatitis.

References

Nitrobenzenes
Chlorobenzenes